Tympanopleura rondoni is a species of driftwood catfish of the family Auchenipteridae. It can be found on the Amazon basin.

References

Fish described in 1914
Freshwater fish of Brazil
Taxa named by Alípio de Miranda-Ribeiro